Roman Municipality is a municipality in Vratsa Province, Bulgaria.

Demography

Religion
According to the latest Bulgarian census of 2011, the religious composition, among those who answered the optional question on religious identification, was the following: 

About 4,200 people, or more than 67%, did not state a religion during the 2011 census. The remainder (~33%) is mostly Bulgarian Orthodox (~87%).

References

Geography of Vratsa Province